James Williams House may refer to:

James Williams House (Kenton, Delaware), listed on the NRHP in Delaware
James Robert Williams House, Carmi, Illinois, NRHP-listed
Jim Williams House, Enterprise, Mississippi, listed on the NRHP in Clarke County, Mississippi
James and Corinne Williams House, Spokane, Washington, listed on the NRHP in Spokane County, Washington

See also
Williams House (disambiguation)